In electronics, a common-gate amplifier is one of three basic single-stage field-effect transistor (FET) amplifier topologies, typically used as a current buffer or voltage amplifier. In this circuit, the source terminal of the transistor serves as the input, the drain is the output, and the gate is connected to ground, or "common," hence its name.
The analogous bipolar junction transistor circuit is the common-base amplifier.

Applications

This configuration is used less often than the common source or source follower. It is useful in, for example, CMOS RF receivers, especially when operating near the frequency limitations of the FETs; it is desirable because of the ease of impedance matching and potentially has lower noise. Gray and Meyer provide a general reference for this circuit.

Low-frequency characteristics

At low frequencies and under small-signal conditions, the circuit in Figure 1 can be represented by that in Figure 2, where the hybrid-pi model for the MOSFET has been employed.

The amplifier characteristics are summarized below in Table 1. The approximate expressions use the assumptions (usually accurate) rO >> RL and gmrO >> 1.

In general, the overall voltage/current gain may be substantially less than the open/short circuit gains listed above (depending on the source and load resistances) due to the loading effect.

Closed circuit voltage gain

Taking input and output loading into consideration, the closed circuit voltage gain (that is, the gain with load RL and source with resistance RS both attached) of the common gate can be written as:
  ,
which has the simple limiting forms
 ,
depending upon whether gmRS is much larger or much smaller than one.

In the first case the circuit acts as a current follower,  as understood as follows: for RS >> 1/gm the voltage source can be replaced by its Norton equivalent with Norton current vThév / RS and parallel Norton resistance RS. Because the amplifier input resistance is small, the driver delivers by current division a current vThév / RS to the amplifier. The current gain is unity, so the same current is delivered to the output load RL, producing by Ohm's law an output voltage vout = vThévRL / RS, that is, the first form of the voltage gain above.

In the second case RS << 1/gm and the Thévenin representation of the source is useful, producing the second form for the gain, typical of voltage amplifiers.

Because the input impedance of the common-gate amplifier is very low, the cascode amplifier often is used instead. The cascode places a common-source amplifier between the voltage driver and the common-gate circuit to permit voltage amplification using a driver with RS >> 1/gm.

See also 
 Electronic amplifier variables
 Two-port networks
 Common drain
 Common source
 Common base
 Common emitter
 Common collector

References

External links
 A 24GHz CMOS Front-end

Single-stage transistor amplifiers